Monochamus foveolatus is a species of beetle in the family Cerambycidae. It was described by Hintz, in 1911.

References

foveolatus
Beetles described in 1911